Bibiche is a commune in the Moselle department in Grand Est in northeastern France.
Formerly known as Bibersheim, the original village was entirely destroyed during the Thirty Years' War.
The localities of Neudorff (German: Neudorf) and Rodlach (German: also Rodlach) are incorporated in the commune since 1810.

Bibiche is also a French language term of endearment based on the term 'biche' (doe).

Population

See also
 Communes of the Moselle department

References

External links
 

Communes of Moselle (department)